The Journal of Hazardous Materials is a peer-reviewed, scientific journal that covers the study of hazardous materials and their impact on the environment. The journal is published by Elsevier and was established in 1975. Since 2022, the editor-in-chief is Zhen He (Washington University in St. Louis). The journal publishes original research articles, review articles, and short communications.

Abstracting and indexing
The journal is abstracted and indexed in:

According to the Journal Citation Reports, the journal has a 2021 impact factor of 14.224.

References

External links

Materials science journals
English-language journals
Elsevier academic journals
Publications established in 1975
Journals published between 13 and 25 times per year